Min Won-sik (July 12, 1886 – February 17, 1921) was a politician and journalist during the late Joseon Dynasty and the Japanese colonial era. He was an advocate for Korean political rights and autonomy. Also a noted writer and poet, he used the literary names of Chungam (정암, 正菴), Nankok (난곡, 蘭谷), Handong (한동, 韓東), and Yangha (양하, 養何).

He believed in the Japanese support of Korean interests. Until his death, he supported a system of Korean autonomy within the Japanese imperial system.

Biography

Under the Korean Empire 
Min was born in the Yangpyeong County in Gyeonggi province. His real father was Min Young-jun, but he was adopted by a relative, Min Young-woo ( real name Min Young-ok). His family belonged to the Yeoheung Min clan, a famous noble family of the Joseon Dynasty, and he was distantly related to Empress Myeongseong and Empress Sunmyeong. It was said that his family was poor for a while. He married Eom Chae-deok in October 1906, after his first wife died, who was a niece of Imperial Noble Consort Sunheon of the Yeongwol Eom clan; King Gojong's concubine.

In 1899, Min went to Japan to teach Korean language at the East Asia Foreign Language School (동아어학교). In February 1905, he returned to Korea and was appointed to a police post (Gyeongmucheong Chongsun (경무청 총순, 警務廳總巡), but he resigned after a year. Under the Japanese protectorate over Korea, he was rapidly promoted under the sponsorship of Ito Hirobumi and Hasegawa Yoshimichi, later becoming Secretary of the Ministry of Interior in July 1906, and Hygiene manager of the Bureau of Health and Sanitation within the Ministry of Interior in August 1906. As part of his efforts to improve the control of infectious diseases and hygiene in Korea, he introduced a system of state-regulated prostitution with mandatory testing for venereal disease.

In March 1907, he was appointed as acting director of a Gwangjewon hospital(광제원 廣濟院). From April 1 to 25, 1907, he was appointed as the director of Gwangjewon hospital, with a concurrent position as the Hygiene Department Director of the Ministry of Internal Affairs.

On January 1, 1910, he took office as CEO of The Newspaper Current Events (시사신문). In 1910, he joined Club Jeongwu (정우회), a political club of Japanophilism.

Under the Japanese general government 
In 1910, after the Annexation of Korea by Japan, Min served on the Central Advisory Institute of the Governor-General of Korea. From the beginning of the Japanese period, Min argued for increased Korean autonomy and political rights within the Japanese Empire. In July 1911, he was appointed Governor of Yangji County, and in March 1914, he was appointed Governor of Icheon County. On several occasions, he petitioned the Japanese Governor-General for Korean suffrage, but his petitions were rejected. From 1915 to 1917, Min served as Commissioner of the Land Survey Committee of Gyeonggi Province, and in September 1917, he was appointed Governor of Goyang County. In 1919, he spoke out against the March 1st movement, believing that Korean independence at that time was impossible. He thought that the Korean independence movement only created needless violence and was detrimental to the cause of increased Korean autonomy, which he felt could be attained under the existing Japanese legal system.

In November 1919, Min resigned as Governor of Goyang County, and he was immediately reappointed to the Central Advisory Institute of the Governor-General of Korea.

In July and November 1920, and again from January to February 1921, Min went to Japan to speak with lawmakers in the Diet of Japan, both in the House of Representatives of Japan and the House of Peers, to promote the cause of Korean autonomy. He stayed in Tokyo, and also met with other Japanese intellectuals. However, Min's efforts to promote autonomy and better rights for Koreans under Japanese rule were strongly opposed by the Korean independence movement.

Death 
On February 17, 1921, while Min was staying at the Imperial Hotel in Tokyo, he was stabbed with a dagger by Korean independence activist Yang Keun-hwan, who was disguised as a carpenter. Min was taken to the Tokyo Imperial University hospital, but he later died of his wounds.

Min's coffin was moved by boat and train for the funeral service. After an hour-long service, his body was taken to Namdaemun. His entire funeral lasted for three days and was hosted by Eom Ju-myeong (his brother in-law) and Eon Jun-won (his father in-law). His body was buried in neighboring hill of Hongreung.

After a few years, his grave was then moved to the temple compound of Gaeunsa, in the Anam-dong neighborhood of Seoul.

Trivia 
Min Won-sik is the 7th great-grandson of Min Yu-jung, Queen Inhyeon's father, and the 6th great-grandson of Min Jin-won, Queen Inhyeon's second older brother. This also makes him the 6th great-grandnephew to Queen Inhyeon. Making him a distant relative to Empress Myeongseong, Min Young-ik and Empress Sunmyeong. He also distantly related to Emperor Gojong, Min Yeong-hwan, and Min Yeong-chan.

Min is also a 7th great-grandson of Song Jun-gil.

Family 
 Father
 Min Yeong-jun (민영준, 閔泳駿) (? - 1910s)
 Adoptive father: Min Yeong-ok (민영억, 閔泳億) (? - 21 May 1918) 
 Adoptive grandfather: Min Dong-ho (민동호, 閔東鎬)
 Brother
 Older brother: Min Yoon-sik (민윤식, 閔允植)
 Adoptive brother: Min Do-seok (민도식, 閔道植)
 Wives
 Unnamed wife
 Eom Chae-deok of the Yeongwol Eom clan (1889 - ?)
 Father-in-law: Eom Jun-won (엄준원, 嚴俊源) (1855 - 13 February 1938)
 Mother-in-law: Lady Jang of the Indong Jang clan (인동 장씨)
 Sister-in-law: Lady Eom of the Yeongwol Eom clan (영월 엄씨)
 Brother-in-law: Eom Jun-myeong (엄주명, 嚴柱明) (19 November 1896 - 6 February 1976)
 Daughter
 Min Chun-ja (민춘자, 閔春子) (1903 - ?); from his first marriage
 Son
 Adoptive son: Min Byeong-seong (민병성, 閔丙星)

Work

Literature 
 Matter of governing in Korea (조선 통치문제, 朝鮮統治問題), 1920

Works of art 
 Muklando (묵란도 墨蘭圖)
 Mukmaedo (묵매도 墨梅圖)
 Mukjukdo (묵죽도 墨竹圖), 1914
 Kukhwa (국화 菊花)

References

External links 
 민원식 
 Min Won-sik 
 김선흠 등 매일신보•시사평론 간부 8명 친일 규명 미디어오늘 2007-12-12 
 국립병원, 일제의 유린을 받기 시작하다. [일제 강점기 의료의 풍경·8] 광제원 Pressian 2011-05-27. 
 조선 최초의 '보건복지부' 장관은? [근대 의료의 풍경·46] 근대 보건의료 개혁 Pressian 2010-08-05. 

Korean politicians
Korean male poets
1886 births
1921 deaths
Korean journalists
Korean writers
Korean collaborators with Imperial Japan
Joseon painters
20th-century Korean painters
Yun Chi-ho
Korean educators
Assassinated Korean politicians
People from Yangpyeong County
People murdered in Tokyo
Yeoheung Min clan
20th-century journalists